High Guardian Spice is an American animated streaming television series created by Raye Rodriguez, who formerly worked for Danger & Eggs as a character designer. The series is produced by Crunchyroll Studios (formerly named Ellation), and was originally slated to be Crunchyroll's first original series before it was delayed for approximately 2 years. The series premiered on Crunchyroll on October 26, 2021.

Premise
A group of four young girls who attend the High Guardian Academy are training to become guardians of West City. At the same time, they deal with friends, enemies, and betrayals, as they attempt to protect everything from an unknown threat against the world.

Characters

Main characters
 Rosemary (voiced by Briana Leon) – A human who has pink hair and wants to become a guardian no matter what. She's brash and bold, and wants to take up her mother's sword and follow in her mother's footsteps.
 Sage (voiced by Lauren White) – A witch who has blue hair and uses Old Magic. She often runs into problems with the New Magic-centered school, as she objects to New Magic.
 Parsley (voiced by Amber Romero) – A dwarf and a magical girl with blond hair. She also works as a blacksmith.
 Thyme (voiced by Michelle Deco) – A magical girl with red hair who is a skilled archer elf. She is committed to saving her home from a mysterious ailment called the Rot.

Supporting characters
 Lavender (voiced by Liisa Lee) – The mother of Rosemary who has lavender hair and was once a well-known Guardian.
 Amaryllis (voiced by Katie McVay) – An entitled, rich, and mean human girl with purple hair who goes to the same academy. Snapdragon's best friend.
 Snapdragon (voiced by Julia Kaye) – A snarky, awkward human student, and friend of Amaryllis, with red hair who goes to the same academy.
 Mandrake (voiced by AJ Beckles) – A human shapeshifter and warlock. 
 The Triad (voiced by Salli Saffioti) – The female human headmasters of the academy. They are immortal. One is young-appearing, one looks middle-aged, and the last one looks elderly. 
 Professor Harkone (voiced by Anthony Brandon Walker) – A human professor who teaches battle tactics.
 Parnelle (voiced by Barbara Goodson) – The youngest male human student in the academy and a child prodigy.
 Neppy Cat (voiced by Cam Clarke) – A housecat near the academy which had secret powers.
 Slime Boy (voiced by Julian Koster) – A human warlock boy and second-year student who loves monsters and is a musician.
 Professor Caraway (voiced by Raye Rodriguez) – A human professor who teaches a class on sacred alphabets and is a powerful guardian. He is also a trans man. Lavender's friend.
 Moss Phlox (voiced by Audu Paden) – A satyr professor who teaches blacksmithing and is a guardian. 
 Fennel (voiced by Audu Paden)  – The father of Rosemary who has violet hair.
 Chicory (voiced by AJ Beckles)  – The brother of Rosemary who has lavender hair.
 Anise (voiced by Haviland Stillwell)  – Sage's lesbian cousin.
 Aloe (voiced by Joy Lerner) – Anise's lesbian elf wife.
 Wyverna Dretch (voiced by Haviland Stillwell) – A female devil professor who teaches an ethics class at the academy.
 Olive (voiced by Stephanie Sheh) – A catgirl working for the Triumvirate. She is a skilled assassin.
 Grog (voiced by Audu Paden) - A creature that is sighted on the academy campus.
 Redbud (voiced by Barbara Goodson) - A science teacher at the academy who puts her students at risk, even putting their lives on the line, in order to "test" them.
 Flora (voiced by Cindy Robinson) - Mother of Thyme who visits her in the city.
 Smoke Face (Voiced by Audu Paden)
 Cal (voiced by SungWon Cho) - A student at the academy who is transphobic to Snapdragon and plays into her gender dysphoria.
 Sage's Mom (voiced by Michelle Deco) - The mother of Sage who appears in one episode.
 Sage's Dad (voiced by AJ Beckles) - The father of Sage who appears in one episode.
 Angie (voiced by Wendee Lee) - Mother of Parsley and many boys. Married to Sorrel.
 Sorrel (voiced by Cam Clarke) - Father of Parsley and many boys. Married to Angie.
 Zinnia (voiced by Cindy Robinson) - Student at academy who wanted to avoid danger.
 Kino (voiced by Raye Rodriguez) - Cat at the academy.
 Demon (voiced by SungWon Cho) - A demon that Thyme tries to appeal to so she can talk to her dad.
 Kelp (voiced by SungWon Cho) - A merperson that Parsley, Thyme, Sage, and Rosemary meet.
 Coral (voiced by Haviland Stillwell) - A mermaid that Thyme has a crush on.
 Hawthorn (voiced by Audu Paden) - Father of Snapdragon who pushed her to be "strong" like "a boy".
 Yarrow (voiced by Audu Paden) - Brother of Snapdragon who made fun of her for being "girlish".
 Elodie (voiced by Karen Strassman) - Mermaid at the underwater academy with Kelp and Coral. Helped by Parsley, Sage, Rosemary, and Thyme.
 The Triumvirate (voiced by Audu Paden) - The mysterious governing group that appears at the end of the series and are presumably villains.

Production and release
In 2013, Rodriguez first came up with the idea for the show and pitched it to Frederator Studios but it was rejected. It was later pitched to Crunchyroll in 2016, developed into a comic in 2017, and re-pitched in 2018 when Marge Dean started at Crunchyroll, becoming a TV show.

The show began production in 2017. According to the resume of Claire Stenger, a co-developer, writer, and co-story editor for the show, she worked on pitch documents, helped with VO sessions, gave notes, and helped with the writing, between September 2017 and October 2018. The show was originally set to be released in early 2019, but was delayed. The show wrapped production in autumn 2019, as noted by Raye Rodriguez, the series creator, and Anime News Network, even though Crunchyroll missed deadlines for release in 2019 and 2020. ANN reviewer Callum May stated that negative backlash by some people to the series was why there was a lack of communication or release of the series and argued that Crunchyroll has an internal and external "communication problem". Rodriguez stated that he produced "twelve 22-minute episodes" of the show on his official website. This number of episodes was confirmed with the official announcement of the series premiere date in October 2021. Apart from Rodriguez, who is a trans man, the show had a writers room composed completely of women, and a crew that was 50% female, and "very ethnically and LGBTQ+ diverse" according to the head of Crunchyroll Studios, then named Ellaton Studios, Margaret Dean.

On February 25, 2020, Crunchyroll released a trailer for 8 original series including High Guardian Spice and seven others.

On September 4, 2020, Ethan Supovitz of CBR described the series as an upcoming Crunchyroll original which would come out in 2020, but gave no exact date.
Later that month, it was revealed that Kristle Peluso, who also was a writer for Onyx Equinox and the second season of gen:LOCK, was a writer for the show. On November 15, 2020, Constance Sarantos of CBR wrote an article advocating for Crunchyroll to release the series, with the latter silent about the show's release date, noting that it received backlash when it was initially announced, but that the delay seems ridiculous at this point.

On May 13, 2021, Rodriguez told people to be "on the lookout" for news regarding the show later in the summer.

In June 2021, it was announced that at the virtual Crunchyroll Expo 2021, taking place from August 5–7, 2021, there will be "news" about the series, specifically at the Crunchyroll Industry Panel on August 6. The same month, Anime News Network stated that show will receive a "new release date in Summer 2021" and no other shows from the studio have been announced apart from High Guardian Spice. On August 6, 2021, a trailer for the series was released, along with new art of characters in the series In the announcement, no release date was noted, only that it will premiere soon, and that the series had magical girl influences.

On September 21, 2021, Crunchyroll listed the show as part of its Fall 2021 lineup.

On October 10, 2021, Crunchyroll revealed the release date as October 26, 2021 and cast list. The series had a 12 episode debut. Before the show's debut, Animation Magazine said that Rodriguez wants to make the world a "more loving and empathetic place by sharing fantastical stories about queer, diverse and relatable characters."

In a November 2021 interview, Rodriguez noted that he was inspired by Magic Knight Rayearth, Sailor Moon, Petite Princess Yucie, and Little Witch Academia, and described the show as having a "hybrid Eastern-Western cartoon style." He also praised the show's cast and crew, noted the representation of various body types in the show, and argued the show's message is that being a Guardian means risking your life to stand up for what you believe, while the protagonists "have to decide for themselves if this really is the path they want to walk down." Rodriguez also said that the content warnings before episodes were not put there because of him, and that the series is not "an adult show" and that while there are curse words and mild blood, it is not for "mature audiences only".

In January 2022, Rodriguez revealed that the series was "significantly low budget by U.S. animation standards," saying that many of the problems people attributed to the series, in terms of writing and art, could be "attributed to this low budget." He added that even though the show was on Crunchyroll, it was a cartoon created using a similar production pipeline to American animations like those on Cartoon Network, describing the show as ambitious artistically within the schedule and budget which was provided. He also stated that Onyx Equinox learned from mistakes made on the show and was union, but had "a lot of the same team and same pipeline" and urged people to think about what happened behind the scenes while thinking about who started hatred toward the show.

LGBT representation
The series features various LGBT characters. Anise, Sage's cousin, is married to an Elf woman named Aloe, with Anise voiced by Haviland Stillwell, a lesbian woman. Professor Caraway, a professor at the High Guardian Academy, is a trans man. In the third episode "Transformations", he is revealed to be a trans man, and is voiced by the show's creator, Raye Rodriguez. Snapdragon is a trans woman. Over the course of the series, Snapdragon "Snap" figures out who she is and Caraway helps her move toward gender transition. The voice actress for Snap, Julia Kaye, confirmed that Snap is a trans woman and that Rodriguez based aspects of the character on her. Rodriguez further confirmed that Snap is a trans woman. The series also includes LGBTQ cast members like openly gay Cam Clarke (who voices Neppy Cat and Sorrel) and ambiguously queer Julian Koster (who voices Slime Boy).

In October 2021, Rodriguez was described as being "passionate about telling diverse and inclusive stories" and noted as wanting to share "fantastical stories about queer, diverse and relatable characters." In a November 2021 interview, Rodriguez noted the importance of representation and voiced optimism for inclusivity in animation. He further praised Crunchyroll for not giving any pushback to LGBTQ representation in the series, adding that in the world of High Guardian Spice, people are "generally a lot more chill about LGBTQ+ people than they are in real life."

Episodes

Reception

Pre-release
In March 2020, John Witiw of CBR said that the series reminded them of RWBY, Mysticons, and Harry Potter, while noting that the names of the characters are a reference to "Scarborough Fair", an English folk ballad made popular by Simon & Garfunkel. Another reviewer, Ethan Supovitz, also of CBR, said that the show has "a lot of anime influences", while blending Eastern and Western animation, calling it reminiscent of Steven Universe, The Owl House, and Dungeons & Dragons.

The show's announcement—and the implication that Crunchyroll was beginning to produce its own media rather than anime and other Asian content—sparked controversy amongst the anime community. Tom Capon of Gay Star News described Rodriguez as the "creative force" behind the show, noting that he'll be "leading an all-female writing room." Callum May of Anime News Network wrote that due to response by some to the show's unveiling, Crunchyroll seemed to have put off releasing the show for almost two years.

Post-release

Responses to the show were mixed-to-negative. On public review sites, the series was given low and negative ratings and criticized for its animation, themes and story. Other critics were more positive. Chiaki Hirai reviewed the first episode for Anime Feminist, describing it as a comfortable and "enjoyable show", praised the show's setting and story, and said that the "explicit LGBTQ positivity" stands out. However, she criticized the lack of English subtitles, saying it makes it hard for people with impaired hearing to watch the show. Evan Valentine, in an article for ComicBook.com, described the series as having a "unique aesthetic." Jade King of The Gamer described the series as not being "afraid to showcase its queer identity" and called the characters "bright, colourful, loving." Samuel Gachon of Collider said that anime-inspired series like High Guardian Spice and RWBY are "not always great." Madeline Carpou of The Mary Sue was more critical, describing the show as "middle of the road", and arguing that the show quality varied, but praised the show's LGBTQ representation and argued that she ultimately liked the series.

Franchise

Merchandise
On November 12, 2021, Crunchyroll announced that a pin set of characters Rosemary, Sage, Parsley, and Thyme, in the chibi style from the show's closing credits, could be bought from the company's web store.

Recipes
On December 10, 2021, Crunchyroll shared four recipes inspired by the show ranging from "sweet to savory treats".

Notes

References

External links
Official website

2018 controversies
2021 American television series debuts
2021 American television series endings
Advertising and marketing controversies
2020s American animated television series
2020s American high school television series
2020s American animated comedy television series
2020s American LGBT-related animated television series
2020s American LGBT-related comedy television series
American animated comedy television series
Animation controversies in television
Television controversies in the United States
English-language television shows
LGBT-related controversies in animation
LGBT-related controversies in television
Anime-influenced Western animated television series
Crunchyroll Originals
Magical girl television series
Teen animated television series
Television series by Sony Pictures Television
Transgender-related television shows